Bristow Helicopters operate a large fleet of 490 helicopters and fixed-wing aircraft. In 2015 it operated 24 helicopter types, however as a result of their restructure due to previous financial difficulties it now operates approximately six types, a significant reduction. The fleet includes unconsolidated affiliates and joint venture partners.

Current Fleet

Training
Training helicopters are used for initial pilot training, typically carrying up to 4 passengers and crew.  Many of Bristow's aircraft are part of a technologically advanced fleet from an avionics perspective.  This has allowed pilots from the academy to transition more smoothly into various roles including aerial tours, utility, and various other operations.    While the majority of Bristow's training helicopters are operated by Bristow Academy in Titusville, Florida, a small number of aircraft operate out of a secondary training base located in New Iberia, Florida.

Fixed-wing aircraft

Bristow's Fixed Wing Service provides a range of fixed-wing transportation services for crew transport to helicopter bases around the world. Bristow operates jet and turbo prop aircraft to meet the needs of the global oil and gas industry.  For subsidiary Eastern Airways fixed wing jet and turboprop aircraft, see Eastern Airways.

Former fleet
 Westland Widgeon - Offshore support operations initially the Persian Gulf and then in Nigeria. Three abandoned in Nigeria as a result of the Nigeria-Biafra conflict. Five operated from 1957 to 1968.
 Westland Wessex - 15 Wessex Mk.60s built at Yeovil, based on the RAF HC.2 but with improved avionics and seating for 10, and one conversion from an ex-Ghana Air Force Wessex Mk.53 by Bristow at Redhill. 16 operated from 1965 to 1981.
 Westland Whirlwind
 Westland AB-47G-4A
 Aerospatiale SA-330J Puma
AS332L Super Puma - Branded by Bristow as "Tiger", were used for North West Shelf hydrocarbon personnel transfer operations & North Sea Oil and Gas.  No longer operated.
Eurocopter AS350
Eurocopter EC 135
Eurocopter EC 155 - Six were in service for Shell Nigeria, aircraft also have external life rafts and are equipped for SAR duties.
Sikorsky S-61 - Were used for SAR out of Den Helder.  No longer operated.
Sikorsky S-76A
Bell 206L
Bell 212
Bell 412
BO-105
BK-117
 Britten-Norman BN-2A-20 Islander
 Twin Otter
 Hiller UH-12C - Purchased in 1964 and operated at their Redhill and Middle Wallop flying schools.
 Scottish Aviation Twin Pioneer Srs1 - Crashed on 4 April 1967 in Nigeria after stalling and during a single engine approach.

References

Lists of aircraft by operator
Bristow Helicopters